Mankind Woman is the thirteenth solo album released from stoner rock musician Brant Bjork. It is his first album released exclusively on the Heavy Psych Sounds Records label. The album is also notable for its primary songwriting collaboration with Low Desert Punk Band guitarist Bubba Dupree.

A music video was made for the song "Chocolatize".

Reception

Reviews for Mankind Woman were mostly positive. QRO explained how the sound of the album is more relaxed compared to the previous bands Bjork has been a member of. Many critics point out similarities with 1960s–70s rock influences including Jimi Hendrix, Pink Floyd and Led Zeppelin. Some note the more psychedelic and political tracks off the album including "Nation of Indica" and "Somebody". Metal Rules called the album "a very easy listening tome of Stoner and Desert music".

The Desert Sun talked about the sound and inspiration of Mankind Woman, "The album actually reveals the Grateful Dead-Black Sabbath roots of Kyuss. "Charlie Gin" has a guitar sound like the 1968 Dead. He titled one song "1968" because the year fascinates Bjork, but it has that deep, sludgy guitar sound of Kyuss."

Track listing

Personnel
Credits adapted from the album's liner notes.

 Brant Bjork – vocals, guitar, bass, drums
 Bubba Dupree – vocals, guitar, bass, percussion
 Sean Wheeler – vocals

Additional musicians
Armand Sabal-Lecco – bass guitar on "Chocolatize"
Nick Oliveri – backing vocals on "Chocolatize"

References

Brant Bjork albums
2018 albums